Beavercreek may refer to:
 Beavercreek, Ohio
 Beavercreek Township, Greene County, Ohio
 Beavercreek, Oregon

See also
 Beaver Creek (disambiguation)